Venetian Nights (French: Nuits de Venise) is a 1931 German French-language operetta film directed by Pierre Billon and Robert Wiene and starring Janine Guise, Germaine Noizet and Roger Tréville. It was an alternative-language version of the 1931 film The Love Express, made at the Emelka Studios in Munich.

Synopsis
After winning a cash prize in a contest a young woman decides to visit Venice. She hires a secretary, a wealthy young man in disguise, to accompany her on the holiday. Once in Italy she attracts several suitors but her real love is her secretary. When she discovers he has deceived her she returns to Berlin on the express and he pursues her to try and declare his love.

Cast
 Janine Guise   
 Germaine Noizet   
 Roger Tréville
 Florelle   
 Lucien Callamand   
 Max Maxudian as Le baron étranger 
 Pierre Nay   
 E. Danelli

References

Bibliography
 Jung, Uli & Schatzberg, Walter. Beyond Caligari: The Films of Robert Wiene. Berghahn Books, 1999.

External links

1931 films
German musical films
1930s French-language films
Films directed by Robert Wiene
Films directed by Pierre Billon
Operetta films
Films of the Weimar Republic
Films set in Berlin
Films set in Venice
Rail transport films
German multilingual films
German black-and-white films
1931 musical films
1931 multilingual films
1930s German films
Films shot at Bavaria Studios